Jousting is a medieval sport.

Joust or Jousting may also refer to:

Arts, entertainment, and media
Joust (novel), by Mercedes Lackey
Joust (video game), a 1982 arcade game
Joust (1989–1996, 2008), a duel in the US version of the television series Gladiators
Joust, an event played in the UK/Australia television series Gladiators

Other uses
Joust (roller coaster), an attraction at Dutch Wonderland
Sea jousting, a water-based sport